Seurat's spiny mouse (Acomys seurati)  is a species of rodent in the family Muridae. 
It is found only in Algeria. Its natural habitats are rocky areas and hot deserts.

References

Acomys
Endemic fauna of Algeria
Mammals described in 1936
Taxonomy articles created by Polbot
Taxa named by Henri Heim de Balsac